Tartabull is a surname. Notable people with the surname include:

Danny Tartabull (born 1962), Cuban-Puerto Rican baseball player, son of José
José Tartabull (born 1938), Cuban baseball player
Melania Tartabull (born 1955), Cuban volleyball player